Tony Martino (born June 9, 1966 in Kelowna, British Columbia) is a former punter and placekicker from 1988–2002 for four Canadian Football League teams.  He was five times named as a league or division All-Star as a punter.

References

External links
Tony Martino at CFLapedia
Just Sports Stats

1966 births
BC Lions players
Calgary Stampeders players
Canadian football punters
Kent State Golden Flashes football players
Living people
Ottawa Rough Riders players
Players of Canadian football from British Columbia
Sportspeople from Kelowna
Toronto Argonauts players